The Basilica and Monastery of St. Benedict Also Basilica of the Monastery of St. Benedict Is an important Catholic architectural complex built in Baroque style located in Olinda, Pernambuco, Brazil, which together with much of the historic center of the city, is a UNESCO World Heritage Site.

History
The foundation of the Monastery of St. Benedict and its annexed church that goes back to the early days of Portuguese colonization in Brazil. The Order of St. Benedict went to Pernambuco at the request of the captain's grantee, Jorge de Albuquerque Coelho, to settle in the colony, offering them various benefits and advantages.

The construction of the present church of St. Benedict began in approximately 1660, after a fire that ravaged the city and old complex during the Dutch invasion, and finished in 1761, according to the inscription.

In 1998, the Church of the Monastery of St. Benedict was elevated to the rank of Minor Basilica by Pope John Paul II, through the apostolic letter "Spectabile quidem."

See also
Roman Catholicism in Brazil
St. Benedict

References

Baroque church buildings in Brazil
Basilica churches in Brazil
Roman Catholic churches completed in 1761
Roman Catholic churches in Pernambuco
18th-century Roman Catholic church buildings in Brazil
Portuguese colonial architecture in Brazil
National heritage sites of Pernambuco